Automobili Estrema is a car manufacturer specialized in the production of electric sports cars founded in 2020 by entrepreneur Gianfranco Pizzuto, former co-founder and financier of Fisker Automotive in 2007.

History

Models

Fulminea 

The car was publicly unveiled at Turin Automobile Museum on May 13, 2021.

Specifications and features

References

External link 

 

Italian brands
Car brands
Luxury motor vehicle manufacturers
Electric vehicle manufacturers of Italy
Car manufacturers of Italy